James Nelson Stickley III (born September 3, 1970) is the CEO of Stickley on Security, a co-founder and board member of TraceSecurity, Inc., and a published author.
He is a cyber security expert who is known for his unique research into vulnerabilities that affect organizations as well as exposing identity theft risks to the average person. Stickley is also the founder of Stickley on Security Inc., a cyber security education company and since 2015 has been the featured cyber security expert in Lifelock infomercials.

Early years
In May 2000, Stickley discovered a buffer overflow vulnerability in the Gauntlet Firewall manufactured by Network Associates (known today as McAfee).  This vulnerability allowed an attacker to remotely execute arbitrary code which resulted in complete compromise of the firewall.  Before this discovery, application firewalls had been considered by many security experts to be the most secure solution for protecting networks on the Internet, and Network Associates had claimed Gauntlet to be the "Worlds most secure firewall".  In September 2001, Stickley discovered an additional buffer overflow vulnerability in the same Gauntlet product.

Discoveries and demonstrations
Stickley continues to educate the public about new cyber security risks and vulnerabilities. Many of his discoveries are featured in news publications and on network news. In 2012 Stickley created a device that was hidden inside a magic marker that allowed him to bypass the locks on hotel rooms throughout the United States. In 2015 Stickley released a video showing the weaknesses in hotel safes after discovering he could bypass the digital locks. In 2017 Stickley discovered a vulnerability in Nordstrom Gift Cards that allowed him to use any Nordstrom Gift Card that was currently active. These discoveries and demonstrations as well as the many other discoveries he has made over the years have led to increased security worldwide through updates to products and applications based on his findings.

Television
Stickley has appeared as an expert on several networks, including CNN, Fox News Channel, NBC, and CNBC.

Since 2015, Stickley has appeared as the "Cyber Security Expert" for LifeLock Inc. (NYSE:LOCK) in their televised and online infomercials.

Books
 The Truth About Identity Theft (2008) Que Publishing
 Beautiful Security – Contributing Author (2009) O'Reilly
 Corporate Insecurity – (In Development) Que Publishing

References

1970 births
Living people
American chief executives